Jens Mikael Lundqvist (born August 29, 1979, in Gävle) is a Swedish table tennis player who competed in the men's singles and men's team event at the 2008 Summer Olympics and the men's team event only at the 2012 Summer Olympics.

References

External links
 
  
 
 
 

1979 births
Swedish male table tennis players
Living people
Table tennis players at the 2008 Summer Olympics
Table tennis players at the 2012 Summer Olympics
Olympic table tennis players of Sweden
People from Gävle
Sportspeople from Gävleborg County